Ek Phool Teen Kante is a 1997 1997 Indian Hindi-language comedy film directed by Anup Malik and produced by Deven Tanna. It stars Vikas Bhalla, Sadashiv Amrapurkar, Kader Khan and Monica Bedi in pivotal roles. It was released on 29 August 1997. It is remake of Hollywood movie Baby's Day Out.

Plot 
A kidnapper enlists a petty thief to abduct a child in vengeance against the child's grandfather. However, the thief falls in love with the cute child.

Cast
 Vikas Bhalla as ACP Vikash
 Monica Bedi as Monica (Vikash's Wife)
 Tinu Anand as Yeda
 Sadashiv Amrapurkar as Kaalia
 Kader Khan as Khopadi
 Kiran Kumar as Raju Bhatnagar
 Saeed Jaffrey as Judge (Father of Monica)
 Aasif Sheikh as Daga (Lawyer of Raju Bhatnagar)

Soundtrack

References

External links

1990s Hindi-language films
1997 films
Films scored by Jatin–Lalit
Indian comedy-drama films